The Rustavi Ensemble, or the Georgian State Academic Ensemble, is a Georgian folk music ensemble that was created in 1968 by Anzor Erkomaishvili, a singer and folklorist from a distinguished Georgian musical lineage that goes back seven generations. Since its formation Rustavi has successfully toured more than 50 countries of the world.

Overview
Songs and dances for work and war, spectacular costumes, the unique Georgian style of polyphonic singing and rich voices characterize the Rustavi Choir. Their sacred hymns with their overlapping, continuously moving harmonies are spellbinding. Rustavi is also performing a high-quality comprising national and diverse traditional dances. Excellent costumes, brilliant performance, and elaborate choreography.

Erkomaishvili's vision was to break through ethnic boundaries of regional styles while performing ethnographically authentic music from all of Georgia. The Rustavi's performance style synthesizes the powerful, rough-hewn sound characteristic of the traditional regional folk choirs with a newer, cleaner, more finely-honed aesthetic whose orientation is towards concert presentation – nowadays on an increasingly international scale.

While striving to preserve, and in some cases recreate, authentic voicings and vocal timbres, the Rustavi singers have simplified the complex scales used by the earlier choirs in order to create firmer, more brilliant harmonies. The use of a smaller number of singers for certain songs has also helped to clarify their musical structure.

Awards
The UNESCO Pacha Prize has been awarded in 2001 to the Rustavi State Academic Ensemble of Singing and Dancing for the safeguarding and promotion of Georgian polyphonic singing in the Republic of Georgia.

Recordings
In 1998, the group recorded the CD Mirangula under the name Rustavi Folk Choir, which has allowed for a wider appreciation of their music outside Georgia. This CD included the folk love song Tsintskaro which has had some popularity globally.

References

External links
Rustavi Ensemble Official Site
Informationen über Rustavi choir
Rustavi choir 

Georgian choirs
A cappella musical groups
Musical groups from Georgia (country)
Musical groups established in 1968
Rustavi
Soviet performing ensembles
1968 establishments in the Soviet Union